The Edge Ice Arena includes The Edge on John Street, The Water's Edge Aquatic Center, and The Edge II Ice Arena a 3,000-seat multi-purpose arena located in Bensenville, Illinois. It had been used as the official training facility and practice arena for the Chicago Blackhawks of the National Hockey League before the team built a new downtown Chicago training facility. The arena also had been used by Chicago Steel (USHL) from 2000 to 2015. The ice arena is also the home to the Roosevelt Lakers men's and women's college ice hockey teams competing at the ACHA Division I level. Until Roosevelt's merger with Robert Morris University Illinois in 2020, it was the home of Robert Morris Eagles ice hockey. The Edge is also home to several local high school ice hockey teams, and is used by local figure skating clubs, youth, and adult rec. ice hockey leagues (the Chicago Blues), as well as public skating.

Facilities
The Edge on John Street has one 200' x 90' ice sheet. It is adjoined to The Water's Edge Aquatic Center, which includes an indoor 8-lane lap pool and 12' deep diving well.
The Edge II Ice Arena has two NHL regulation-sized ice sheets. The main sheet of ice seats 2,800 fans in addition to nine luxury sky suites and an executive club level seating area.

Special events
 The Edge II has been the host of four American Collegiate Hockey Association Men's Division I National Championship Tournaments in 2005, 2010, 2013 and 2016.
 The Edge II has been the host of one American Collegiate Hockey Association Women's Division I & Division II National Championship Tournament in 2008.
 In 2010 and 2011 the facility hosted those years' High School Hockey National Championship Tournaments.
 In April 2010 the facility also hosted "Ice Dreams", a 2-hour skating spectacular presented by Cuties and hosted by Dorothy Hamill. The show featured skating talent like Johnny Weir, Rachel Flatt and many more.
 The Wagon Wheel Skating Club held their annual skating competition event here from September 11–13, 2015.

References

External links
 Edge Ice Arenas

College ice hockey venues in the United States
Edge Ice Arena, The
Indoor ice hockey venues in Illinois
Robert Morris Eagles
1997 establishments in Illinois
Sports venues completed in 1997